The Third Cage is the third collaboration between guitarist Dario Mollo and former Black Sabbath vocalist Tony Martin. All music was written by Mollo, with Martin contributing the lyrics. Mollo also produced, mixed and mastered the album.

Reception 

The Third Cage was met with mostly positive reviews upon its release. Most reviewers praised Mollo's guitar work in particular and the heavier songs, but criticized some tracks as being "by-the-numbers '80s pop metal".  The album's opening and closing tracks, "Wicked World" and "Violet Moon", are often cited as stand-out tracks, the former as an example of a hard rock song "written and performed almost to perfection" and the latter for its "emotive essence".

Track listing

Personnel
Band members
Tony Martin – vocals
Dario Mollo – lead guitar, bass, keyboards
Fulvio Gaslini – bass
Roberto Gualdi – drums
Dario Patti – keyboards
Brian War – keyboards

Production
Dario Mollo – production, engineering, and mixing
Mizuko – photography
Felipe Machado Franco – cover art
Tony Martin –  liner notes

References 

Tony Martin (British singer) albums
Dario Mollo albums
2012 albums
Collaborative albums